Knockdrum Stone Fort is a circular stone rath, ringfort, or hilltop fort near Castletownshend in County Cork, Ireland. It was restored before 1860, and there were archaeological excavations from 1930–31. The three-metre thick walls are reported as either 2 metres or 1.75 metres high depending on the source, and as 29 metres in diameter. The site is owned by the Irish Government which has declared it a national monument. 

Inside the fort are the stone foundations of a rectangular building with a souterrain, a type of structure characteristic of the European Iron Age, but often of later date in Ireland. There are cup marks both inside and outside the wall.

References

External links

National Monuments in County Cork
Archaeological sites in County Cork
Hill forts in Ireland